Zinc finger, FYVE domain containing 26 is a protein that in humans is encoded by the ZFYVE26 gene.

Function 

This gene encodes a protein which contains a FYVE zinc finger binding domain. The presence of this domain is thought to target these proteins to membrane lipids through interaction with phospholipids in the membrane. Mutations in this gene are associated with autosomal recessive spastic paraplegia-15.

References

Further reading